Elaine Stuhr (born 1936), Nebraska state senator from Bradshaw, Nebraska
 Stuhr Museum of the Prairie Pioneer, a museum located in Grand Island, Nebraska
 Jerzy Stuhr (born 1947, Kraków), Polish actor
 Kevin Stuhr Ellegaard, née Stuhr Larsen (born 1983), Danish professional football goalkeeper
 Maciej Stuhr (born 1975, in Kraków), Polish actor, comedian, impressionist, psychologist

References

See also 
 Stuhr, a municipality in the district of Diepholz, in Lower Saxony, Germany

German-language surnames
Surnames from nicknames